The London, Midland and Scottish Railway (LMS) Stanier Class 5 4-6-0, commonly known as the Black Five, is a class of  steam locomotives. It was introduced by William Stanier and built between 1934 and 1951, of which 842 were built and were numbered 4658-5499 (BR then renumbered 44658-45499). Several members of the class survived to the last day of steam on British Railways in 1968, and eighteen are preserved.

Origins 
The Black Five was a mixed-traffic locomotive, a "do-anything go-anywhere" type, designed by Stanier, who had previously been with the GWR. In his early LMS days, he designed his Stanier Mogul  in which he experimented with the GWR school of thought on locomotive design. A number of details in this design he would never use again realising the superiority of details not used on the GWR. Stanier realised that there was a need for larger locomotives. These were to be the LMS version of the GWR Halls but not a copy, as the Hall was too wide to run most places in Britain. They shared similar cylinder arrangement (two outside), internal boiler design and size and 6 foot driving wheel diameters.

In their early days the locomotives were known as the "Black Staniers" from their black livery, in contrast to Stanier's other class of 4-6-0, the LMS Jubilee Class, which were painted crimson (and known until April 1935 as the "Red Staniers"). Later on, the nickname of the former became "Black Five", the number referring to the power classification. This was originally 5P5F, but from 1940 was shown on cabsides as the simple figure 5. Eight hundred and forty-two were constructed. The locomotives were an instant success and were well-liked by their crews for their versatility. One of them was known for reaching speeds of up to 96 mph in service.

Construction 
There were a number of detail variations in the locomotives and they did not all remain in the same condition as built. Some locomotives built under British Railways administration were used as test beds for various design modifications with a view to incorporating the successful modifications in the Standard Classes of locomotives built from 1951 onwards. These modifications included outside Caprotti valve gear, roller bearings (both Timken and Skefco types) on the coupled and tender axles in varying combinations, and an experimental steel firebox. Other locomotives had modified draughting to "self clean" the smokebox (thereby reducing turn-around and disposal times and eliminating or mitigating one of the most unpopular jobs).

The domeless engines 

Numbering started from 5000, with the first twenty being ordered from Crewe Works in April 1934, and a further fifty (5020–5069) ordered from the Vulcan Foundry in 1933. The first of the Vulcan Foundry engines entered service in 1934, and the entire order of 50 was delivered before the first Crewe-built engine, No. 5000, was completed in February 1935. The first 57 locomotives were built with domeless boilers with straight throatplates and a low degree of superheat (14 elements in two rows), the boilers of the remaining 13 (5007–5019) were provided with a three-row version (21 elements) having greater total surface area and giving less obstruction to gas flow. The original 57 boilers were converted later to higher superheat (24 elements) and fitted with a dome. Further orders were placed with Crewe (5070–5074), Vulcan Foundry (5075–5124) and Armstrong Whitworth (5125–5224) for a total of 155 locomotives which were also built with domeless boilers with straight throatplates and 21 element superheaters. All these boilers, including the early converted ones with a dome, were fitted indiscriminately to any of the first 225 engines, which could appear at various times with domed or domeless boilers.

However, many of the early frames were converted to accept sloping throatplate boilers, as listed below. This modification was carried out to provide a stock of spare boilers for the early engines, which would minimise the time spent in works by engines awaiting a fresh boiler. All locomotives from no. 5225 were fitted when new with the sloping throatplate boiler. All extra boilers made had the sloping throatplate arrangement, and only one example of a later engine having been fitted with a straight throatplate boiler is known - no. 45433. Several different patterns of boiler were used on the locomotives, running into double figures. The throatplate design was the most significant, but there were also different numbers of superheater flues, firegrate arrangement, stay material, dome and water feed arrangements, washout plug placement, etc. in various combinations.

The following locomotives were built with straight throatplate boilers, but were later fitted with a sloping throatplate boiler (date in brackets). Conversion was done by relocating the frame stretcher immediately in front of the firebox. Some of them reverted to straight throatplate at a later date, and these are also shown where known. Those marked with an asterisk were fitted with a boiler which had the top feed on the front ring on the date shown. In the case of no. 45087 it had previously been converted. The first conversion was carried out on no. 5022, and the last known was on no. 45163, which has been preserved.

5002 (12/37), 45007 (1/60), 45008 (1/60*), 45011 (1/49*+), 5020 (2/37), 5022 (10/36) reverted (10/58), 5023 (2/38) reverted (3/53), 5026 (2/37) reverted (1/59), 5027 (12/36), 5040 (11/36), 5045 (11/54), 5047 (1/37), 45049 (7/54) reverted (8/59), 5054 (1/37), 5057 (11/37), 5058 (11/37), 5059 (7/45), 45066 (4/60), 45082 (12/56*), 45087 (9/55) (12/60*), 5097 (1/37), 5108 (6/45), 45109 (5/48), 5142 (12/37), 45151 (3/51), 45163 (5/61), 45169 (7/55), 45197 (5/60)

+ The subsequent history of 45011 is not clear. Official records have gone missing and have not been relocated. There is a photograph in existence dated April 1963, showing 45011 ex-works with a straight throatplate boiler and simple top feed, i.e. without the dome-like shape.

NB: The official records were not always updated after around 1960/61, although some were. For example, in the case of no. 45082, it was fitted with a brand new boiler at the end of 1956, one of the last batch of four boilers that were manufactured for this class. Since it survived in service for a further nine and a half years, there is no doubt that 45082 will have had at least one further boiler lift and indeed a photograph exists of it at Hellifield with a given date of May 1962 showing it with an older boiler with the dome and feed both on the tapered ring. Unfortunately it is not clear from the photo whether it is a straight or sloping throatplate boiler.

The pre-war domed engines 
A further 227 were ordered from Armstrong-Whitworth in 1936, the largest single locomotive order ever given by a British railway to an outside contractor. Crewe built a further 20, which had higher degree superheat boilers, with 28 elements, unlike the AW boilers, which had 24 elements.

5471, built at Crewe in 1938, would be the last built for five years. During the early stages of the Second World War, the priority was for heavy freight engines, and the closely related 8Fs were produced in large numbers.

Wartime and postwar domed engines 
In 1943 construction was restarted, with Derby Works building its first. Construction continued up to no. 5499. As the numbering block from 5500 was allocated to the Patriot Class, a further batch of 200 locomotives were numbered from 4800 to 4999, followed by a batch from 4658 to 4799. By this time the LMS had been nationalised, and British Railways added 40000 to all numbers. Eventually the 842 examples would number 44658–45499.

Ivatt engines and experimental modifications
From early 1947, engines were built with the top feed on the front ring of the boiler (from no. 4998), and Nos 44758-767 had a longer wheelbase (27 ft 6in rather than 27 ft 2in, with the change in the coupled wheelbase from 7 ft + 8 ft to 7 ft + 8 ft 3in); this was necessary in order to accommodate the Timken roller-bearing housings without fouling the ashpan. In 1948, George Ivatt introduced more modifications to bearings and valve gear; other experimental Ivatt features included the use of steel rather than copper fireboxes on certain engines, and the fitting of double blastpipes & chimneys in some instances. 44738-57 were built with Caprotti valve gear. The last two, nos. 44686 and 44687 built at Horwich in 1951, were fitted with a new arrangement of Caprotti valve gear, which was later used on some of the BR standard Class fives, and the BR class 8 4-6-2.

No. 4767, built at Crewe and delivered in December 1947, had outside Stephenson valve gear: instead of eccentrics, double return cranks were used to drive the eccentric rods, and a launch-type expansion link was used. This one cost £13,278, which was about £600 more than those built at the same time with Walschaerts' valve gear. The aim of the experiment was to find out if a valve gear having variable lead (as opposed to the constant lead of the Walschaerts' motion) would affect performance. On trial, it proved to have no advantage, although in normal service it did gain a reputation as a good performer on banks.

Accidents and incidents
Five people were killed and more than 30 were injured. No. 5025 was repaired and survives at the Strathspey Railway.
In 1941, locomotive No. 5425 was severely damaged in a Luftwaffe air raid. It was subsequently repaired at Crewe Works.
On 1 January 1946, engine No. 5495 was involved in the Lichfield rail crash, in which the freight train it was hauling was derailed at  station, Staffordshire due to faulty points. The train collided with a passenger train, killing 20 people and injuring 21.
On 23 January 1955, locomotive No. 45274 was hauling an express passenger train that was derailed due to excessive speed on a curve, in the Sutton Coldfield rail crash. Nineteen people were killed and 64 were injured.
On 16 January 1951, a locomotive of the class was hauling a passenger train that collided with a light engine that was standing foul of the line at  due to a signalman's error. Both trains were derailed; thirteen people were injured.
On 2 October 2015, locomotive No. 45231 was working a private charter train for West Coast Railways through Doncaster when it was noticed that its TPWS (Train Protection and Warning System) had been isolated by the footplate crew. Isolation of the TPWS had been a factor in the Wootton Bassett SPAD incident in March of the same year. As a result, WCRC were suspended from operating on the national network by the ORR.

Construction details

Names 

Only five Black Fives received names during their mainline working lives, a small percentage of the total produced, although seven more have been named in preservation (see below). All of those named in mainline service were named after Scottish regiments. Locomotive 5155 carried the name The Queen's Edinburgh for only two years during the Second World War. Some sources have noted that no photographic confirmation of this naming is extant, although this is neither unique to the class, nor unexpected given restrictions on photography during wartime. The evidence for the naming of the locomotive is set out in full in various sources.

Withdrawal 
The class remained intact until 1961 when 45401 was the first Black Five to be withdrawn from stock following a collision at Warrington, although the boiler was re-used and actually lasted to the end of steam on BR. The remainder of the class were withdrawn between 1962 and 1968. Some members of the class, 46 in total, survived to the last day of steam on BR in August 1968. No. 45318, a Lostock Hall based engine, hauled the last scheduled train on 3 August 1968; a Preston to Liverpool exchange. The locomotive was withdrawn a few days later and then scrapped the following year at Drapers.

Preservation 
Eighteen Black Fives have been preserved, with twelve of them being purchased directly from BR for preservation (these being 44767, 44806, 44871, 44932, 45000, 45025, 45110, 45212, 45231, 45305, 45407 & 45428), the remaining six being rescued from Woodham Brothers' Barry Scrapyard (these being 44901, 45163, 45293, 45337, 45379 & 45491). Members of each of the builder's batches have survived into preservation: seven LMS-built engines and eleven by outside contractors. Of the eighteen to be preserved, fourteen have operated in preservation, the class members that have not yet run being 44901, 45163, 45293 & 45491. Twelve Black Fives have been operated on the main line in preservation: 44767, 44871, 44932, 45000, 45025, 45110, 45212, 45231, 45305, 45337, 45407 & 45428.

As of September 2022 there are seven Black Fives in traffic, six of which have valid main line certificates. 44871, 44932, 45212, 45231 & 45407 have full main line certificates for use over the national network, while 45428 is certified for main line use only between Grosmont and Whitby with occasional visits to Battersby, and 45025 is only able to operate on preserved lines. 44767, 44806, & 45337 are in the process of undergoing overhauls while four, 44901, 45163, 45293 and 45491, are undergoing restorations from Barry Scrapyard condition.

No. 44781 was a candidate for preservation, but was sadly scrapped. In 2019, parts were rediscovered in Bartlow and in the National Railway Museum's collection in York.

Note: Some locos may usually have a nameplate but marked names indicate that the loco is not presently wearing them. Loco numbers in bold indicate their current number.

Preserved locos 

† In all cases names are historically inaccurate, i.e. they have all been applied since preservation. Some engines might still have their names but where marked indicates that they currently do not carry them. Either for authenticity or other reasons like the engine is running in another identity.
44767 carries a plaque on the splasher beneath the nameplate that reads 'This locomotive was named by the Rt. Hon. William Whitelaw, C.H., M.C., M.P. at Shildon on 25 August 1975, to commemorate the 150th anniversary of the Stockton and Darlington Railway.'
44806 was named after the TV series "Magpie" in 1973, it continued to wear this name during the time it was based at the Lakeside and Haverthwaite Railway and when it relocated to the Llangollen Railway until it was withdrawn for overhaul in 2003. After emerging from its last overhaul in 2007 it ran without the nameplates but was later named after its former owner "Kenneth Aldcroft". It is now based at the North Yorkshire Moors Railway and has since had its nameplates removed.

Details of the boilers currently fitted to preserved examples

Sound
45212 passing Green End

In fiction 
In The Railway Series children's books by the Rev. W. Awdry and its television adaption Thomas and Friends, the character Henry the Green Engine was rebuilt into a Black Five at Crewe Works after his accident with the Flying Kipper.

In artwork 
A Black 5 locomotive appears in the 1938 René Magritte painting Time Transfixed.

See also
BR Standard Class 5

Further reading 
 David Hunt, Bob Essery and Fred James with David Jennison and David Clarke LMS Locomotive Profiles (three volumes, three pictorial supplements):
 No. 5 The mixed traffic class 5s. Part 1. Nos. 5000–5224. (+ pictorial supplement)
 No. 6 The mixed traffic class 5s. Part 2. Walschaerts and Stephenson valve gear engines from the 5225–5499 and 4658–4999 series. (+ pictorial supplement)
 No. 7 Mixed traffic class 5s: Caprotti valve gear engines and class summary (+ pictorial supplement)
 J.S. Whiteley, Gavin Morrison The Power of the Black Fives

References

Bibliography

 
5 Stanier Black Five
4-6-0 locomotives
Vulcan Foundry locomotives
Armstrong Whitworth locomotives
Railway locomotives introduced in 1934
Standard gauge steam locomotives of Great Britain